Scoparia spinosa is a moth in the family Crambidae. It was described by Wei-Chun Li, Hou-Hun Li and Matthias Nuss in 2010. It is found in China (Guangdong, Guizhou, Hainan, Hong Kong, Hunan, Sichuan) and Taiwan.

The length of the forewings is 5–5.5 mm. The forewings are sparsely suffused with blackish-brown scales. The antemedian and postmedian lines are white. The hindwings are white to pale brown.

Etymology
The species name refers to the phallus with many small spinelike cornuti and is derived from Latin spinosus (meaning spinous).

References

Moths described in 2010
Scorparia